Albert Henry Percival Snow (9 August 1852 – 5 April 1909) was an English first-class cricketer active 1874–80 who played for Middlesex. He was born in Bedford; died in Gunnersbury.

References

1852 births
1909 deaths
English cricketers
Middlesex cricketers